The Silvermaster File of the United States' Federal Bureau of Investigation is a 162-volume compendium totalling 26,000 pages of documents relating to the FBI's investigation of GRU and NKVD moles inside the U.S. federal government both before and during the Cold War.

Beginning in 1945 with the allegations of defector and former NKVD courier Elizabeth Bentley (Venona cover names “Myrna”; Umnitsa, “Clever Girl”), the file is also known as the Bentley file or Gregory file ("Gregory" was the FBI code name for Bentley).

The file takes its name from Nathan Gregory Silvermaster (Venona cover names Pel, Pal, "Paul"; "Robert") of the War Production Board, whom Bentley named as head of an underground Communist network known as the Silvermaster Group. Among the people named in the file in connection with this group are President Franklin Roosevelt's Administrative Assistant Lauchlin Currie (Venona cover name "Page") and Assistant Secretary of the Treasury Harry Dexter White (Venona cover names “Lawyer”; “Jurist”; "Richard").

Also named in the file are Victor Perlo (Venona cover name "Raider"), chief of the Aviation Section of the War Production Board, and contacts of his Perlo group, including Alger Hiss (Venona cover name “Ales”), secretary general of the United Nations Charter Conference. (Like several others identified by Bentley, Hiss had been identified independently by another defecting Soviet courier, Whittaker Chambers, to Assistant Secretary of State Adolf Berle in 1939.) Among dozens of others named by Bentley in this file in connection with this network is Duncan Lee (Venona cover name “Koch”), confidential assistant to William Donovan, founder and director of the Office of Strategic Services (OSS), wartime predecessor of the CIA.

Prosecutions
Original plans for Bentley to serve as a double agent and gather sufficient evidence to prosecute the Soviet agents identified in the Silvermaster files were ruined when her identity was inadvertently leaked and the USSR quickly shut down its operations. The Silvermaster file in combination with other secret proofs such as the Venona intercepts gave US intelligence the identity of many Soviet agents without the practical means to secure convictions. Also, the statute of limitations for an espionage prosecution was quite short.  This was a significant part of the backstory of McCarthyism. Bentley's double agent career would have enabled the US to expose the spies without compromising Venona and losing that as an ongoing intelligence source.

See also
 Active measures
 History of Soviet and Russian espionage in the United States
 List of Soviet agents in the United States

Notes

References
 FBI Report, Underground Soviet Espionage Organization (NKVD) in Agencies of the United States Government], October 21, 1946 (FBI Silvermaster file, Volume 82),

Further reading
 “Testimony of Elizabeth T. Bentley,” Hearings Regarding Communist Espionage in the United States Government, Committee on Un-American Activities, House of Representatives, Eightieth Congress, Second Session, Public Law 601 (Section 121, Subsection Q [2]), Washington: United States Government Printing Office, 1948.

External links
 The Cold War International History Project (CWIHP) has the full text of former KGB agent Alexander Vassiliev's Notebooks, containing new evidence on Soviet espionage in the United States during the Cold War
 The Education and Research Institute has posted summaries and text of most of the 162 volumes of the Silvermaster File.
 The FBI Silvermaster File on the Internet Archive

Espionage in the United States
Espionage scandals and incidents
Venona project
Spy rings
Communist Party USA
1945 establishments in the United States
Federal Bureau of Investigation